Abu Qatada al-Ansari, also known as Harith ibn Rab'i, was one of the companions of Muhammad. He assisted the battles of Uhud and Hudaybiyya.

Biography 
Abu Qatada was born in Medina. He hailed from Banu Sulaym, branch of Khazraj tribe

Abu Qatada had a Mawla or a freed slave named "Abu Muhammad". Presumably, he had a son named "Qatada ibn al-Harith". His wife was Kabsha bint Kab ibn Malik.

Life during period of Muhammad in Medina 
Abu Qatada participated in the Battle of Badr, which caused him to earn the honorific title of al-Badri by the Muslim community of the time.

Sometimes after  the battle of Khandaq in 627, there is an incident after  Muhammad returned from the raid of Banu Lihyan. a band of armed men of Ghatafan tribe led by Abdur Rahman Uyana ibn Hisn al-Fazari raided the outskirts of Medina and seized 20 milch camels. They also killed the shepherd and took his wife as a captive. Muhammad immediately dispatched several hundreds of horsemen consisted of Abu Qatada, Miqdad ibn Aswad, Ukkash ibn al-Mihsan, Akhram al-Asadi and others. Akhram and Abu Qatada then engaging some of raiders, Abu Qatada personally engaged Abdur Rahman Uyana in duel after Akhram has been killed by Abdurrahman before and finally able to defeat him while Salama ibn al-Akwa', who has been engaged the invaders before Abu Qatada arrived still fighting. shortly after that Abu Qatada marched on to catch up with other soldiers ahead until afternoon Due to this accident Muhammad praised both Abu Qatada and Salama saying:

Later in 629 AD, Muhammad appointed Abdullah bin Atik as the leader of the expedition to assassinate Abu Rafi because he is the instigator and mediator of tribal alliance during battle of Khandaq. Abdullah and Abu Qatada urged to the Muhammad they want to carry out the mission since the 'Aws tribe counterpart has successfully assassinated Ka'b ibn al-Ashraf before. Abu Qatada and Abdullah then bringing along other 3 members of Khazraj clansmen namely Mas'ud ibn Sinan, Abdullah ibn Unays and Khuza'i ibn Aswad. marching towards the fortress where Abu Rafi lives in Hijaz. they arrived in destination during the dusk. they successfully sneak out of the fortress in the night and then killed Abu Rafi before they immediately leave the place to report to Muhammad.

In November 629, Abu Qatada lead two military expeditions under instruction of Muhammad. The first was an expedition to the place of Khadira, which took place in 8th month of Islamic calendar. Abu Qatada are tasked to punish Ghatafan tribe, as Muhammad has been informed that the tribe is amassing their troops to attack Medina. Abu Qatada leading about 18 men to mount the raid, which took 15 days to reach their destinations. the expedition was a success as Abu Qatada killed and captured several members of Ghatafan tribe during the raid while also manage to secure spoils. This expedition, along with Expedition of Ibn Abi Al-Awja Al-Sulami helped the growing reputation of the still infant Muslims community in Medina as later several Arab tribes such as Banu Dzobian, Banu Fazara, Banu Murra and Banu Abs pledged their allegiance to Muhammad.

The second expedition of Abu Qatada occurred about one month later during Ramadan. Muhammad tasked Abu Qatada to raid a place called Idam with 8 personnel in order to divert the attentions in Arab soils from the plan to mobilize entire Muslims army onto Mecca.

During the Battle of Hunayn Abu Qatada has narrated the word of Muhammad regarding those fighters who were fleeing, his contributions to the battle, and the rules pertaining to the divisions of war booty.

Ali's era (656–661) 
He participated in all campaign of Ali ibn ali Thalib during his tenure as Caliph including the Battle of the Camel. when entering Basra, he was riding a powerful bay. He wore a white turban, carried a sword and a bow, and led a contingent of 1000 horsemen.

Legacy 
Abu Qatada known in Islamic scholars community as narrators of many hadiths which quoted in several hadith collections, including Sahih Bukhari.

Abu Qatada narrated:
''A funeral procession passed by Allah's Apostle who said, "Relieved or relieving?" The people asked, "O Allah's Apostle! What is relieved and relieving?" He said, "A believer is relieved (by death) from the troubles and hardships of the world and leaves for the Mercy of Allah, while (the death of) a wicked person relieves the people, the land, the trees, (and) the animals from him."

Abu Qatada also narrated hadith regarding fiqh ruling of swearing in transaction which became basis guidance for Sunni Madhhab scholars to implement Sharia law regarding communication during any economical transaction

Bibliography

Notes

References 

Sahabah hadith narrators